The Brabham BT30 was an open-wheel Formula 2 racing car used in the 1969, 1970, and 1971 European Formula Two Championship.

The Brabham BT30 used a complex tubular space frame and was powered by the FVA Cosworth engine. The large rear wings fitted in 1969 were replaced with smaller ones in 1970. The BT30 also had an aluminum fuel tank in 1969, which was replaced in 1970 by steel tanks integrated into the side panels of the monocoque.

In 1969 Piers Courage finished fifth in the BT30 of the Frank Williams Racing Cars team in the Formula 2 European Championship. Driving a privately entered BT30, Peter Westbury finished sixth overall at the end of the year, one place behind Courage. Additionally, Westbury entered the car to race in the 1969 European Formula 5000 Championship.

In 1970 the BT30 was the most used car in the Formula 2 championship. Of the 40 drivers who scored points in Formula 2 this season, 22 started with a BT30. Derek Bell was runner-up.

References

Brabham racing cars
Formula Two cars
1960s cars
1970s cars